Meysamabad (also Romanized as Meys̱amābād) is a village in Jahadabad Rural District, in the Central District of Anbarabad County, Kerman Province, Iran. At the 2006 census, its population was 712, in 137 families.

References 

Populated places in Anbarabad County